Floodbrook Clough is a woodland in Cheshire, England, near Runcorn. It is owned and managed by the Woodland Trust.

References

Forests and woodlands of Cheshire
Runcorn